Chuck Amuck: The Movie is a 1991 documentary film about Chuck Jones's career with Warner Bros., centered on his work with Looney Tunes; narrated by Dick Vosburgh.

Home video 
The film was released on VHS. It also appears as a special feature on Looney Tunes Golden Collection: Volume 3 and Looney Tunes Platinum Collection: Volume 1.

References

External links 
 

1991 films
1991 documentary films
Looney Tunes films
Documentary films about film directors and producers
Documentary films about animation
1990s American animated films
American documentary films
Films scored by Carl Stalling